Michelangelo Tilli or Michele Angelo Tilli  (8 August 1655 – 13 March 1740) was an Italian physician and botanist, noted for his publication of Catalogus Plantarum Horti Pisani (Florence 1723).

Biography 

Michelangelo was born in Castelfiorentino, the son of Desiderio Tilli and Lucrezia Salvadori. In 1677 he graduated in medicine and surgery at the University of Pisa and in 1681 was appointed as naval surgeon by Cosimo III. He embarked on a Tuscan galley for the Balearic Islands and went to Constantinople in 1683 with the florentine surgeon Pier Francesco Pasquali to tend to Musaipp Pasha Mustafa II, the son of the sultan Mehmed IV, after a serious fall from his horse. From there they spent some time in Albania and Adrianople, and Tilli went on to Tunis, to study the remains of Carthage and to collect botanical specimens.

He became professor of botany at Pisa in 1685 and also director of the Botanical Garden of Pisa, introducing plants from Asia and Africa. He was among the first in Italy to use greenhouses for plants, making it possible to cultivate pineapples and coffee in Italy. Carl Linnaeus praised Pisa's botanical garden as one of the finest in Europe. Cosimo III was an enthusiastic supporter of the garden, arranging for the importation of plants from as far afield as the Americas.

He became a member of the Royal Society in 1708.

References

Bibliography 

 Giovanni Lami, Commemorazione, in Novelle letterarie, 20 maggio 1740, n. 21, col. 325-330;
 Carl Linnaeus, Philosophia botanica, Stockholm 1751, pp. 2-17;

External links
 

1655 births
1740 deaths
People from Castelfiorentino
18th-century Italian botanists
17th-century Italian physicians
18th-century Italian physicians
Academic staff of the University of Pisa
17th-century Italian botanists
Fellows of the Royal Society